St. Philomena’s Cathedral is a Catholic church that is the cathedral of the Diocese of Mysore, India. The full name is the Cathedral of St. Joseph and St. Philomena. It is also known as St. Joseph's Cathedral. It was constructed in 1936 using a Neo Gothic style and its architecture was inspired by the Cologne Cathedral in Germany. This is one of the tallest churches in Asia.

Patron saint
St. Philomena is a Latin Catholic saint and martyr of the Roman Catholic Church. She was a young Greek princess martyred in the 4th century. The remains of a teenage girl no older than 14 were discovered on 24 May 1802 in the Catacombs of Saint Priscilla at the Via Salaria in Rome. Accompanying these remains were a set of tiles bearing a fragmented inscription containing the words LUMENA PAXTE CUM FI, words of no known meaning in that order. The letters were rearranged to read PAX TECUM FILUMENA, which in Latin translates to Peace with you, Filumena. also some symbols of her martyrdom and a vessel, containing dry blood, was also found in the tomb. From these discoveries, it was concluded that a Christian named Filumena (Philomena) was buried in the tomb and the vessel containing blood was thought to be her relic, an evidence of a martyr's death.

History

A church at the same location was built in 1843 by Maharaja Mummadi Krishnaraja Wodeyar. An inscription which was there at the time of laying the foundation of the present church in 1933 states: "In the name of that only God - the universal Lord who creates, protects, and reigns over the universe of Light, the mundane world and the assemblage of all created lives - this church is built 1843 years after the incarnation of Jesus Christ, the Enlightenment of the World, as man". In 1926, Sir T. Thumboo Chetty who was the Huzur Secretary to the Maharaja of Mysore, Nalvadi Krishnaraja Wodeyar obtained a relic of the Saint from Peter Pisani, Apostolic Delegate of the East Indies. This relic was handed over to Father Cochet who approached the king to assist him in constructing a church in honour of St. Philomena. The Maharaja of Mysore laid the foundation stone of the church on 28 October 1933. In his speech on the day of the inauguration, he said: "The new church will be strongly and securely built upon a double foundation — Divine compassion and the eager gratitude of men." The construction of the church was completed under Bishop Rene Feuga's supervision. The relic of Saint Philomena is preserved in a catacomb below the main altar. This church is a good example of blending  of local culture. Some of the female statues are dressed with local traditional dress, Saree.

Architecture
The church was designed by a Frenchman named Daly.
It was designed to be built in the Neo Gothic style with inspiration drawn from the Cologne Cathedral. The floor plan of the cathedral resembles a cross. The long part of the cross is congregation hall called the nave. The two arms of the cross are the transepts. The part containing the altar and the choir is the crossing. The cathedral has a crypt that houses a statue of St. Philomena. The main hall (nave) can seat up to 800 people and contains stained glass windows depicting scenes from the birth of Christ, the Last Supper, the Crucifixion, the Resurrection and the Ascension of Christ.
It is considered to be Asia's second largest church.

See also
 Mandi Mohalla
 Dufferin Clock Tower
 Hanumanthanagar
 Mysore North, Naidu Nagar
 St. Philomena's College, Mysore
 List of Heritage Buildings in Mysore

Notes

External links 

Tourist attractions in Mysore
Mysore North
Roman Catholic churches in Karnataka
Gothic Revival church buildings in India
Roman Catholic churches completed in 1936
Roman Catholic cathedrals in Karnataka
Churches in Mysore
20th-century Roman Catholic church buildings in India
St. Philomena’s Cathedral | Church Timings and history